Al Urban may refer to:

 Al Urban (photographer)
 Al Urban (musician), a rockabilly musician
 Al-ʽUrban, a town in Libya